Godfrey Lampson Tennyson Locker-Lampson (19 June 1875 – 1 May 1946) was a British Conservative politician, poet and essayist.

Birth and education
The elder son of the poet Frederick Locker and his second wife Hannah Jane Lampson, daughter of Sir Curtis Lampson, he was educated at Cheam School, Eton and Trinity College, Cambridge. His younger brother Oliver Locker-Lampson was also a Conservative MP.

Diplomatic and military service
Locker-Lampson entered the Foreign Office in 1898, was appointed Third Secretary in December 1900, and was posted at The Hague and St Petersburg until he left the Diplomatic service in 1903. He then studied law at Lincoln's Inn and was called to the Bar in 1908, though never practised. He was commissioned a second lieutenant in the Middlesex Yeomanry on 14 March 1900. He served with the Royal Wiltshire Yeomanry from 1914 to 1916 and was briefly ADC to Lt.-General Henry Hughes Wilson of IV Corps on the Western Front, during which time he was said to have used his diplomatic skills to effect a rapprochement between Wilson and Lloyd George.

Parliamentary career
He unsuccessfully contested Chesterfield at the 1906 general election, and served as Conservative Member of Parliament for Salisbury from 1910 to 1918, then Wood Green from 1918 to 1935.

He was Parliamentary Private Secretary to the Home Secretary, Sir George Cave, in 1916–17, and to the Assistant Foreign Secretary, Lord Robert Gascoyne-Cecil in 1918. He was a Charity Commissioner in 1922-23 and served in government as Under-Secretary of State for Home Affairs from March 1923 to January 1924, and again from November 1924 to December 1925, when he represented the Office of Works in the House of Commons. During this latter period his PPS was Anthony Eden at the Home Office and then briefly at the Foreign Office. He was Under-Secretary of State for Foreign Affairs from December 1925 to June 1929.  He was a member of the British Delegation to the League of Nations at Geneva in 1928 and was appointed a Privy Counsellor in the same year.

Literary achievements
He was a published poet, essayist and historian. His works include A Consideration of the State of Ireland in the Nineteenth Century (1907), On Freedom (1911), Oratory, British and Irish. The Great Age from the accession of George the Third to the Reform Bill, 1832 (1918), The Country Gentleman, and Other Essays (1932), and Sun and Shadow: Collected Love Lyrics and other poems (1945). He was also a noted collector of ancient Greek coins and published an important catalogue of his collection in 1923.

Personal life
He was married twice: to Sophy Felicité de Rodes (1905), who died in 1935, and to Barbara Hermione Green (1937). He had three daughters by his first wife, Felicity, Stella and Elizabeth.

References

External links 
 Godfrey Locker-Lampson in Barlborough
 

1875 births
1946 deaths
Middlesex Yeomanry officers
British Army personnel of World War I
People educated at Eton College
Members of the Privy Council of the United Kingdom
Conservative Party (UK) MPs for English constituencies
UK MPs 1910
UK MPs 1910–1918
UK MPs 1918–1922
UK MPs 1922–1923
UK MPs 1923–1924
UK MPs 1924–1929
UK MPs 1929–1931
UK MPs 1931–1935
Royal Wiltshire Yeomanry officers
Alumni of Trinity College, Cambridge
People educated at Cheam School